The primitive koa finch (Rhodacanthis litotes) is a species of Hawaiian honeycreeper. It was endemic to Hawaii. Of the four species in the genus Rhodacanthis, it and the scissor-billed koa finch became extinct before the arrival of the first Europeans to Hawaii in 1778. It is known as the ancestor of all koa finches.

Description 
There was probably a small distinct difference between the sexes. Based on fossils, it is known that the adult primitive koa finch had a slightly curved, thick bill.

Distribution 
Primitive koa finch fossils have been found on Maui and Oahu.  It is believed that it inhabited lowland dry forests and savannas, where dominant plant species included ka palupalu o kanaloa (Kanaloa kahoolawensis), aalii (Dodonaea viscosa), loulu (Pritchardia spp.), and koaia (Acacia koaia).  Unlike other species of Rhodacanthis, koa (Acacia koa) was not present in significant numbers in its habitat.

Diet 
The primitive koa finch was a granivore, with a bill adapted to eat the hard seeds and pods of legumes, especially ka palupalu o kanaloa (Kanaloa kahoolawensis) and koaia (Acacia koaia).  It may have also taken caterpillars and aalii (Dodonaea viscosa) berries, as these were observed being eaten by other species in the genus.

Status
The primitive koa finch is believed to have gone extinct some time after Polynesians first arrived in Hawaii; however, very little else is known about this species. Due to its early extinction it is only known from fossil remains. Other Hawaiian honeycreepers are known to have become extinct or very rare due to habitat loss, introduced predators and avian diseases. It is possible the extinction of the primitive koa finch also involved these factors.

References 

BirdLife International 2004. Himatione sanguinea. 2006 IUCN Red List of Threatened Species. Downloaded on 10 July 2007.

Rhodacanthis
Birds described in 2005
Fossil taxa described in 2005
Hawaiian honeycreepers
Extinct birds of Hawaii
Holocene extinctions
Late Quaternary prehistoric birds
Taxa named by Helen F. James